The Norwegian Federation of American Sports ( NAIF) is the governing body for American football, cheerleading, disc sports, and lacrosse in Norway. It was created on January 1, 2010 by the merger of the Norwegian American Football and Cheerleading Federation (Norges Amerikansk Fotball og Cheerleading Forbund), the Norwegian Frisbee Federation (Norges Frisbeeforbund), and the Norwegian Lacrosse Federation (Norges Lacrosse Forbund). NAIF is a member of the Norwegian Olympic Committee, the International Federation of American Football, the International Cheer Union, the World Flying Disc Federation, and World Lacrosse.

References

External links
Official website of the Norwegian Federation of American Sports (in Norwegian)

Organisations based in Oslo
American Sports
2010 establishments in Norway
American football in Norway
Cheerleading organizations
Lacrosse governing bodies in Europe
Ultimate (sport) governing bodies
American football governing bodies in Europe
Sports organizations established in 2010
Disc golf governing bodies